Tabuk may refer to:

Tabuk, Kalinga, the capital city of Kalinga province of the Philippines
Tabuk Province, a province of Saudi Arabia
Tabuk, Saudi Arabia, capital city of the province
Tabuk Regional Airport
Battle of Tabuk, a military expedition initiated by the Islamic prophet Muhammad in October, AD 630
Tabuk Sniper Rifle, an Iraqi rifle